is a passenger railway station located in the southern part of Miyamae-ku, Kawasaki, Kanagawa Prefecture, Japan, operated by the private railway company Tokyu Corporation.

Lines

Station layout
The station consists of two opposed elevated side platforms serving two tracks. The platforms are connected to the station building by underpasses.

Platforms

History 
Miyazakidai Station was opened on April 1, 1966.

History 
Saginuma Station was opened on April 1, 1966. In the spring of 2011, a second ticket gate, on the North side, was added to the station.

Passenger statistics
In fiscal 2019, the station was used by an average of 37,290 passengers daily. 

The passenger figures for previous years are as shown below.

Surrounding area
Train and Bus Museum
Kawasaki City Miyazaki Elementary School
 Kawasaki City Miyazaki Junior High School

See also
 List of railway stations in Japan

References

External links

 

Railway stations in Kanagawa Prefecture
Railway stations in Japan opened in 1966
Tokyu Den-en-toshi Line
Railway stations in Kawasaki, Kanagawa